Kaylee Hartung (born November 7, 1985) is an American broadcaster. Born in Baton Rouge, Louisiana, she has served as a contributor for CBS News, ESPN, CNN,  ABC News, and NBC News. In July 2022, she was announced as the sideline reporter for Thursday Night Football on Amazon Prime Video.

Early life
Hartung was born in Baton Rouge, Louisiana.  She graduated from Episcopal High School in 2003. She earned Bachelor of Arts degrees in journalism and politics from Washington and Lee University, graduating in 2007.

Career

She was a CBSNews.com reporter on the daily Washington Unplugged program and featured correspondent for Unplugged Under 40. Following a summer internship with NBC, she began her career as an assistant to Bob Schieffer, which led to an associate producer position on Face the Nation.

She then worked at ESPN, serving in particular as a correspondent for SEC Network. In 2017, Hartung was hired by CNN. In 2019, Hartung left CNN and joined ABC News as a correspondent.

In July 2022, Amazon announced that Hartung would return to sports broadcasting as a sideline reporter for Thursday Night Football.

In January 2023, Kaylee joined NBC News' The Today Show as a National correspondent. Also, Kaylee helped with NBC Sports' NFL Wild Card Weekend with Al Michaels and Tony Dungy.

References

External links 
Washington Unplugged

1985 births
Living people
Episcopal High School (Baton Rouge, Louisiana) alumni
People from Baton Rouge, Louisiana
People from Washington, D.C.
American women journalists
Washington and Lee University alumni
CBS News people
ABC News people
College football announcers
College basketball announcers in the United States